The 2018 season was Melaka United Soccer Association's 95th season in club history and 2nd season in the Malaysia Super League.

Kit
 Supplier: Warrix Sports
 Main sponsors: Edra & CGN
 Other sponsors: Restoran Melayu, Hatten Groups

Players

First-team squad

Transfers

In 
1st leg

2nd leg

Out 
1st leg

2nd leg

Friendlies

Pre-season 

Vietnam Pre-season Tour 2018

MB Terengganu Cup

In-season

Competitions

Overall

Overview

Malaysia Super League

Table

Results by matchday

Matches

The fixtures for the 2018 Malaysia Super League season were announced on 11 January 2018.

Malaysia FA Cup

Malaysia Cup

Group stage

Statistics

Appearances and goals

|-
! colspan="16" style="background:#dcdcdc; text-align:center"| Goalkeepers

                            
|-
! colspan="16" style="background:#dcdcdc; text-align:center"| Defenders

|-
! colspan="16" style="background:#dcdcdc; text-align:center"| Midfielders

|-
! colspan="16" style="background:#dcdcdc; text-align:center"| Forwards

|-
! colspan="15" style="background:#dcdcdc; text-align:center;"| Left club during season
|-

|-

Clean sheets

Notes

References

Melaka United F.C.
Melaka United F.C. seasons
Malaysian football clubs 2018 season
Malaysian football club seasons by club